América Futebol Clube, or simply América, is a Brazilian football team from Teófilo Otoni, Minas Gerais.  Founded on May 12, 1936, since 2004 they continuously competed in Campeonato Mineiro. In 2009, they were promoted to the top-tier of Campeonato Mineiro for the first time.

Achievements
Campeonato Mineiro
Semifinals (1):2011

Season Records

Stadium
Their home stadium is the Nassri Mattar stadium, capacity 5,000.

References

Association football clubs established in 1936
Football clubs in Minas Gerais
1936 establishments in Brazil